Gymnopilus medius is a species of mushroom in the family Hymenogastraceae.

Phylogeny
G. medius is in the lepidotus-subearlei grouping of the genus Gymnopilus.

See also

List of Gymnopilus species

References

External links
Gymnopilus medius at Index Fungorum

medius
Fungi of North America